Mount Dudzic, is a  mountain in the Misinchinka Ranges of the Hart Ranges in the Northern Rocky Mountains.

Named for Canadian Army Private Albert Dudzic, K50052, enlisted at Prince George, BC.  Private Dudzic served with the Royal Canadian Army Service Corps when he was killed 28 April 1943, age 20. With no known grave, his name is inscribed on the Halifax Memorial, panel 16.  The name was officially adopted in 1963.

References 

Two-thousanders of British Columbia
Northern Interior of British Columbia
Canadian Army soldiers
World War II memorials in Canada
Canadian Rockies
Cariboo Land District